Baragudi is a village located in Indi Taluk, Bijapur district, Karnataka State, India. This village is situated on the bank of the River Bheema. The land around the village is high yielding and notable for sugar cane crops. The Kannolli family is one of the oldest and well educated families in this village. Nearby villages are Lachyan, Loni, Ahirasang and Padanur.

See also
Bijapur district

Villages in Bijapur district, Karnataka